Jili District was a district of the city of Luoyang, Henan province, China. It was merged into Mengjin District of Luoyang in March 2021.

It is the only county-level division of Luoyang that is situated north of the Yellow River and is not contiguous with the other five districts of Luoyang.

Administrative divisions
As of 2020, this district is divided to 4 subdistricts.
Subdistricts
Xixiayuan Subdistrict
Kangle Subdistrict
Jili Subdistrict
Heyang Subdistrict

References

Districts of Luoyang